Philippos Syrigos (1948 – 13 October 2013) was a Greek investigative journalist and sports reporter who investigated doping cases in Greece. He was assaulted by masked men on 18 October 2004 in Athens but recovered.

Syrigos worked for a Greek daily newspaper Eleftherotypia. During the 2004 Olympics, he reported on the doping scandal of Kostas Kenteris and Katerina Thanou. He later claimed that he was aware of the alleged accident two hours before it happened. He has also written about hooliganism, the Paranga scandal, debts incurred by some of the Greek football clubs and other dealings connected to 2004 Olympics in Athens.

On 18 October 2004, when Syrigos was leaving the studios of radio Sport FM in Kallithea, Athens, three men attacked him, stabbed him and hit him with iron bars. Syrigos was rushed to hospital where he was operated and released for home care on 23 October. His attackers have never been traced.

Syrigos, aged 65, died of cancer on 13 October 2013.

References

External links
 News24.com - Sports Editor Attacked

Date of birth missing
2013 deaths
Greek investigative journalists
Greek sports journalists
1948 births
Journalists from Athens
Greek victims of crime